James Rodger Brandon (1927 – 19 September 2015) was an American academic who was a professor of Asian theater specializing in Kabuki and Sanskrit theater at the University of Hawaii. He was a member of the generation of scholars who first brought Asian theater to English-speaking audiences in the postwar period, translating dozens of plays and directing many performances, some of which  toured widely throughout the United States.

Biography
Brandon was born in Mazomanie, Wisconsin. He was drafted into the military in 1950 and was stationed in Japan and Korea during the Korean War. It was with only two days left before his tour ended and he returned to the United States that he saw his first kabuki performance. It was this performance that awakened his interest in Asian theater. He returned to the University of Wisconsin–Madison to take a PhD in theater on the G.I. Bill in 1955.

After completing his PhD, he entered the foreign service, where he was a cultural affairs officer stationed in Jakarta, Indonesia from 1955 to 1957.

The Japanese government awarded him the Order of the Rising Sun, Golden Rays with Rosette, Imperial Decoration in 1994.

Scholarly contributions
In 1965, along with Andrew T. Tsubaki and Farley Richmond, he founded the Afro-Asian Theater Project, which after a series of reorganizations has been known since 1987 as the Association for Asian Performance.

He co-founded the Asian Theatre Journal with Elizabeth Wichmann-Walczak in 1984.

References

Bibliography

Selected works by Brandon
Authored books
 
 
 

Edited books
 
 
 

Translations
 
 
 
 
 
 
 

Academic journal articles

Works cited

External links
 Asian Theater Journal page at the University of Hawaii
 The Association for Asian Performance
 James R. Brandon memorial webpage

See also

 Kabuki
 Sanskrit drama
 Javanese shadow puppetry
 Chūshingura

Kabuki
Historians of theatre
Theatre studies
1927 births
2015 deaths
University of Hawaiʻi faculty
University of Wisconsin–Madison alumni
Place of birth missing
American military personnel of the Korean War
People from Mazomanie, Wisconsin